The women's 100 metres at the 2003 All-Africa Games were held on October 11–12.

Medalists

Results

Heats
Qualification: First 3 of each heat (Q) and the next 4 fastest (q) qualified for the semifinals.

Wind:Heat 1: +0.4 m/s, Heat 2: -0.1 m/s, Heat 3: -0.3 m/s, Heat 4: +0.1 m/s

Semifinals
Qualification: First 4 of each semifinal (Q) qualified for the final.

Wind:Heat 1: +0.5 m/s, Heat 2: 0.0 m/s

Final
Wind: +0.2 m/s

References
Results
Results

100
2003